The 2001 Alamo Bowl featured the Iowa Hawkeyes, and the Texas Tech Red Raiders. It was a rematch of the 1996 Alamo Bowl.

Game summary
Nate Kaeding scored the first points of the game for Iowa, as he connected on a 36-yard field goal, to give Iowa an early 3–0 lead. In the second quarter, running back Aaron Greving scored on a 1-yard touchdown run to increase Iowa's lead to 10–0. At the end of the half kicker Clinton Greathouse kicked a 50-yard field goal to pull Tech to within 10–3.

In the third quarter, quarterback Kliff Kingsbury connected with wide receiver Wes Welker for a 20-yard touchdown pass to tie the game at 10. Later in the quarter, Kaeding connected on a 31-yard field goal to give Iowa the lead again, at 13–10. In the fourth quarter, he kicked another field goal, this one from 46 yards out to give Iowa a 16–10 lead.

Iowa's defense continued to force Texas Tech to attempt field goals rather than score touchdowns. Robert Treece kicked a 23-yard field goal to cut Iowa's lead to 16–13. Tech's defense held, and Tech got the ball back. This time, Robert Treece kicked a 37-yard field goal to tie the game at 16.  Kaeding provided the winning score, kicking a 47-yard field goal, to make the final score 19–16.

As time expired, a Kliff Kingsbury pass to future NFL Hall of Famer Wes Welker was knocked away by future NFL Defensive Player of the Year Bob Sanders.

References

External links
 Review of game by USA Today

Alamo Bowl
Alamo Bowl
Iowa Hawkeyes football bowl games
Texas Tech Red Raiders football bowl games
Alamo Bowl